The Ames Moot Court Competition is the annual upper level moot court competition at Harvard Law School. It is designed and administered by the HLS Board of Student Advisers and has been in existence since 1911, when it was founded by a bequest in honour of the erstwhile dean of the School who had died the year before, James Barr Ames.  Cases take place in a hypothetical United States state named Ames.

Format and history

As currently structured, the official competition begins in the fall (usually October or November) of students' 2L year with a round-robin qualifying round. Each team at this stage consists of four participants, who each argue twice in teams of two. The four teams with the highest scores advance to the semi-finals in the spring. Each team is then allowed to add two participants, for a total of six people per team; two members of each team present oral argument in this round, typically before a panel of one federal appellate judge, one district judge, and one state court judge. In the competition's final round, held in the fall of the 3L year, the two remaining teams argue a case before a panel that usually consists of one U.S. Supreme Court justice and two judges from the United States courts of appeal. Prizes are awarded for the best brief, best oralist, and best overall team.

The competition originally was organized around the school's now-defunct law clubs. The competition occurs primarily in students' 2L year because the faculty found that, for students who did not finish at the very top of their first year class, "it [was hard] for them to take the same interest in their work, particularly in the work within the law clubs, participation in which depends entirely upon their own volition." Thus, to encourage students to continue working hard, the Ames finalists received prizes of $200 for first place and $100 for second place. After several years of a single-elimination tournament, the format changed to a round-robin that more closely resembles the current qualifying round structure.

The final round competition is one of the most popular events at the Law School each year, especially because a justice from the U.S. Supreme Court usually presides. The Ames Final Round has occasionally been televised on C-SPAN.

Many have found the Ames competition to be a demanding but rewarding experience. Chief Justice Mary Mullarkey of the Colorado Supreme Court, an Ames semi-finalist in her time at Harvard, wrote that "what was most rewarding was the opportunity to work as a team with other students. We could debate, argue, and challenge each other as we analyzed the case and prepared the briefs. The process was much more satisfying than the routine of classroom lectures and solitary examinations. The Ames competition provided a realistic view of what practicing law could be like."

Winners
Previous notable winners include:

References

External links
 Official website

Harvard University
Harvard Law School
Competitions
Moot court competitions